Central High School is a former school building located Central, Pickens County, South Carolina.  It was built in 1908 and expanded in 1925. It is located at 304 Church Street.

It was listed on the National Register of Historic Places in 1994.

It is currently used for residential living.

References 

School buildings on the National Register of Historic Places in South Carolina
School buildings completed in 1925
Neoclassical architecture in South Carolina
Former school buildings in the United States
Defunct schools in South Carolina
Buildings and structures in Pickens County, South Carolina
National Register of Historic Places in Pickens County, South Carolina
Central, South Carolina
1925 establishments in South Carolina